PLOS (for Public Library of Science; PLoS until 2012 ) is a nonprofit publisher of open-access journals in science, technology, and medicine and other scientific literature, under an open-content license. It was founded in 2000 and launched its first journal, PLOS Biology, in October 2003. 

 PLOS publishes 12 academic journals, including 7 journals indexed within the Science Citation Index Expanded, and consequently 7 journals ranked with an impact factor.

PLOS journals are included in the Directory of Open Access Journals (DOAJ). PLOS is also a member of the Open Access Scholarly Publishers Association (OASPA), a participating publisher and supporter of the desbloqueo for Open Citations, and a member of the Committee on Publication Ethics (COPE).

History 

The Public Library of Science began in 2000 with an online petition initiative by Nobel Prize winner Harold Varmus, formerly director of the National Institutes on Health and at that time director on Memorial Sloan–Kettering Cancer Center; Patrick O. Brown, a biochemist at Stanford University; and Michael Eisen, a computational biologist at the University on California, Berkeley, and the Lawrence Berkeley National Laboratory. The petition called for all scientists to pledge that from September 2001 they would discontinue submission on articles to journals that did not make the full text of their articles available to all, free and unfettered, either immediately or after a delay of no more than six months. Although tens of thousands signed the petition, most did not act upon its terms; and in August 2001, Brown and Eisen announced that they would start their own nonprofit publishing operation. In December 2002, the Gordon and Betty Moore Foundation awarded PLOS a $9 million grant, which it followed in May 2006 with a $1 million grant to help PLOS achieve financial sustainability and launch new free-access biomedical journals.

The PLOS organizers turned their attention to starting their own journal, along the lines of the UK-based BioMed Central, which has been publishing open-access scientific articles in the biological sciences in journals such as Genome Biology since 2000.

As a publishing company, the Public Library of Science officially launched its operation on 13 October 2003, with the publication of a print and online scientific journal entitled PLOS Biology, and has since launched 11 more journals. One, PLOS Clinical Trials, has since been merged into PLOS ONE. Following the merger, the company started the PLOS Hub for Clinical Trials to collect journal articles published in any PLOS journal and relating to clinical trials; the hub was discontinued in July 2013.

The PLOS journals are what is described as "open-access content"; all content is published under the Creative Commons "attribution" license. The project states (quoting the Budapest Open Access Initiative) that: "The only constraint on reproduction and distribution, and the only role for copyright in this domain, should be to give authors control over the integrity of their work and the right to be properly acknowledged and cited."

In 2011, the Public Library of Science became an official financial supporting organization of Healthcare Information For All by 2015, a global initiative that advocates unrestricted access to medical knowledge, sponsoring the first HIFA2015 Webinar in 2012.

In 2012 the organization quit using the stylization "PLoS" to identify itself and began using only "PLOS".

In 2016, PLOS confirmed that their chief executive officer Elizabeth Marincola would be leaving for personal and professional reasons at the end of that year. In May 2017, PLOS announced that their new CEO would be Alison Mudditt with effect from June.

In 2021,  PLOS announced a policy that required changes in reporting for researchers working in other countries as an attempt to address neo-colonial parachute research practices.

Financial model 
To fund the journals, PLOS charges an article processing charge (APC) to be paid by the author or the author's employer or funder. In the United States, institutions such as the National Institutes of Health and the Howard Hughes Medical Institute have pledged that recipients of their grants will be allocated funds to cover such author charges. The Global Participation Initiative (GPI) was instituted in 2012, by which authors in "group-one countries" are not charged a fee, and those in group-two countries are given a fee reduction. (In all cases, decisions to publish are based solely on editorial criteria.)

PLOS was launched with grants totaling US$13 million from the Gordon and Betty Moore Foundation and the Sandler Family Supporting Foundation. PLOS confirmed in July 2011 that it no longer relies on subsidies from foundations and is covering all of its operational costs. Since then the PLOS balance sheet has improved from $20,511,000 net assets in 2012–2013 to $36,591,000 in 2014–2015.

Publications

Other partners 

In April 2017, PLOS was one of the founding partners in the Initiative for Open Citations.

Headquarters 
PLOS has its main headquarters in Suite 225 in the Koshland East Building in Levi's Plaza in San Francisco. Previously, the company had been located at 185 Berry Street. In June 2010, PLOS announced that it was moving to a new location in order to accommodate its rapid growth. The move to the Koshland East Building went into effect on 21 June 2010.

See also
 List of open-access journals
 arXiv e-print archive
 Open Archives Initiative
 Open Access Scholarly Publishers Association, of which PLOS is a founding member

Footnotes

References

Adam, David. "Scientists Take on the Publishers in an Experiment to Make Research Free to All" The Guardian, 6 October 2003.
Albanese, Andrew. "Open Access Gains with PLoS Launch: Scientists Call for Cell Press Boycott; Harvard Balks on Big Deal." Library Journal, 15 November 2003, 18–19.

Butler, Declan. "Public Library Set to Turn Publisher as Boycott Looms." Nature, 2 August 2001, 469.

Case, Mary. "The Public Library of Science." ARL: A Bimonthly Report on Research Library Issues and Actions from ARL, CNI, and SPARC, no. 215 (2001): 4. https://web.archive.org/web/20151110091642/http://www.arl.org/newsltr/215/plos.html

Doyle, Helen. "Public Library of Science (PLoS): Committed to Making the World's Scientific and Medical Literature A Public Resource." ASIDIC Newsletter, no. 87 (2004): 9–10. https://nfais.memberclicks.net/assets/ASIDIC/Newsletters/s04_newsletter.pdf 

Eisen, Michael. "Publish and Be Praised." The Guardian, 9 October 2003. http://www.guardian.co.uk/life/opinion/story/0,12981,1058578,00.html
Foster, Andrea L. "Scientists Plan 2 Online Journals to Make Articles Available Free." The Chronicle of Higher Education, 10 January 2003, A29.

Kleiner, Kurt. "Free Online Journal Gives Sneak Preview." New Scientist, 19 August 2003, 18. https://www.newscientist.com/news/news.jsp?id=ns99994071

Malakoff, David. "Opening the Books on Open Access." Science Magazine, 24 October 2003, 550–554.
Mantell, Katie. "Open-Access Journal Seeks to Cut Costs for Researchers." SciDev.Net, 15 January 2004. http://www.scidev.net/News/index.cfm?fuseaction=readNews&itemid=1194&language=1 

Mellman, Ira. "Setting Logical Priorities: A Boycott Is Not the Best Route to Free Exchange of Scientific Information." Nature, 26 April 2001, 1026.

Olsen, Florence. "Scholars Urge Boycott of Journals That Won't Join Free Archives." The Chronicle of Higher Education, 6 April 2001, A43.
Peek, Robin. "Can Science and Nature Be Trumped?" Information Today 20, no. 2 (2003): 19, 50–51.
———. "The Future of the Public Library of Science." Information Today 19, no. 2 (2002): 28.
———. "The Scholarly Publisher as Midwife." Information Today 18, no. 7 (2001): 32.
Pickering, Bobby. "Medical Journals to Get Open Access Rival." Information World Review, 21 May 2004. http://www.iwr.co.uk/iwreview/1155321
Public Library of Science. "Open Letter to Scientific Publishers." (2001). http://www.plos.org/about/letter.html 
Reich, Margaret. "Peace, Love, and PLoS." The Physiologist 2003; 46(4): 137, 139–141. https://web.archive.org/web/20041223045509/http://www.the-aps.org/news/PloS.pdf

Suber, Peter. "The Launch of PLoS Biology." SPARC Open Access Newsletter, no. 67 (2003). http://www.earlham.edu/~peters/fos/newsletter/11-02-03.htm#launch 

Velterop, Jan. "Vendor View." Information World Review, 1 December 2001. http://www.iwr.co.uk/iwreview/1150688
Wadman, Meredith. "Publishers Challenged over Access to Papers." Nature, 29 March 2001, 502.

External links

 

 
Organizations based in San Francisco
Science and technology in the San Francisco Bay Area
Open access publishers
Non-profit academic publishers
Articles containing video clips